Isabella Frances FitzRoy St. John (1792 – 27 August 1875) was a British novelist, short story writer, and poet. 

She was born Isabella Frances FitzRoy on 6 May 1792, the daughter of George Henry FitzRoy, 4th Duke of Grafton and Charlotte Fitzroy, Countess of Euston.  In 1829, she married Henry Joseph St. John, son of George St John, 3rd Viscount Bolingbroke.  He died in 1857.  She was a grace and favour resident of Hampton Court Palace, living in Suite XXI from 1839 until her death.  Isabella St. John died on 27 August 1875. 

One colourful reviewer lambasting contemporary novels in general singled her novel Mrs. Cleveland out as a "deleterious fungus" in which "Everything is improbable.  The characters are...colourless, insipid, and vague...the language is such as would disgrace a daily governess at Whitechapel, in her feeblest efforts at English composition" 

Her heavily annotated copy of Jane Austen's Mansfield Park is discussed in The Lost Books of Jane Austen (2019) by Janine Barchas.

Bibliography 

 Wedded Life In the Upper Ranks. The Wife and Friends, and the Married Man.  2 vol. 1831
 Geraldine Hamilton; Or, Self-Guidance. A Tale.  2 vol.  1832
 Mrs. Cleveland, and the St. Clairs: A Novel.  3 vol.  London: Bentley, 1836.
 Augustus Courtenay, and Other Tales.  2 vol.  London: Shoberl, 1852.

References 

  

Created via preloaddraft
1792 births
1875 deaths
British women novelists